The 1934 Chattanooga Moccasins football team was an American football team that represented the University of Chattanooga—now known as the University of Tennessee at Chattanooga—as a member of the Dixie Conference during the 1934 college football season. In Scrappy Moore's fourth season as head coach, the team compiled a record of 3–3–2 overall with a mark of 3–0–1 in conference play, placing second. The Moccasins played their home game at Chamberlain Field in Chattanooga, Tennessee.

Schedule

References

Chattanooga
Chattanooga Mocs football seasons
Chattanooga Moccasins football